Alberta has a diverse music scene of pop, rock, country, jazz, folk, caribbean, classical, and blues music. Music festivals in the Summers are representing these genres. Choral music, ethnic music of many nationalities, all are found in Alberta.

The independent music scene was covered by independent magazines: Fast Forward Weekly in Calgary, and Vue Weekly in Edmonton, neither magazine is currently active. BeatRoute Magazine is still in publication, but covers a wider scope (western Canada, including British Columbia, Alberta, Saskatchewan, and Manitoba).

History 
Aboriginal music has been present in Alberta since the end of the last ice age, nearly 10,000 years ago in Southern Alberta, around 8,000 year ago in the North.  Aboriginal instruments in this part of North American were limited to the voice and the easily  made and portable drum.  During the fur trade, European fur traders (mostly Orcadian Scots and French-Canadians) added a variety of their own instruments, such as the guitar and the accordion, but most importantly the fiddle.  The fiddle became the basis of a distinctive style used in the Western fur trade and associated with the Métis people in particular.  In his memoir Buffalo Days and Nights, respected Métis guide and interpreter Peter Erasmus writes that French Métis fiddlers from Lac Ste. Anne played for the Christmas celebrations at Fort Edmonton in 1856.  This tradition persisted even after Ontarian and European immigration began to increase after 1870. A list of dances published in the Edmonton Bulletin on 3 February 1896 includes several of Métis and Scottish origin.

Alberta music organizations 
ACMA The Association of Country Music in Alberta
 AMIA Alberta Music Industry Association
 CMC Canada Music Centre (Calgary)
 Edmonton Symphony Orchestra
 Edmonton Opera Association
 Calgary Civic Symphony
 Calgary Philharmonic Orchestra
 Calgary Opera
Cosmopolitan Music Society
 NMC National Music Centre (Calgary)
 Rocky Mountain Symphony Orchestra

Music festivals 
 Canmore Folk Music Festival
 Edmonton Folk Music Festival
 Calgary Folk Music Festival
 Calgary International Blues Festival
 Calgary Midwinter Bluesfest
 North Country Fair
 South Country Fair
 PeaceFest
 Edmonton's Labatt Blues Festival
 Edmonton International Jazz Festival
 Blueberry Bluegrass Festival
 Big Valley Jamboree
 Calgary International Reggae Festival
 Sonic Boom
 Soundtrack Music Festival

Prominent figures 
The following are some musical figures associated with the Canadian province of Alberta.
 Axis of Advance
 Violet Archer
 Jann Arden
 Ruth B.
 Tommy Banks
 Moe Berg
 Big Sugar
 Bill Bourne
 Paul Brandt
 Cadence Weapon
 Captain Tractor
 Carson Cole
 Emerson Drive
 Faunts
 Feist
 George Fox
 Jerry Jerry and the Sons of Rhythm Orchestra
 Jr. Gone Wild
 Carolyn Dawn Johnson
 Katie B
 k.d. lang
 Billy Klippert
 Loverboy
 Corb Lund
 Cripple Creek Fairies
 Tate McRae
 Joni Mitchell
 Nickelback From Hanna. Had a #1 Billboard Hot 100 hit with the post-grunge/hard rock "How You Remind Me" in 2001-2002. This was the Billboard Year-End #1 single of 2002. They had a #1 album on the Billboard 200 with All the Right Reasons in 2005.
 Melissa O'Neil
 Maren Ord
 Out of Your Mouth
 Kalan Porter
 Jan Randall
 Ruth B
 Shout Out Out Out Out
 SNFU
 Social Code
 Stereos
 Tariq
 Tegan and Sara
 Mark Templeton
 Ten Second Epic
 The Dudes
 The Grassroot Deviation
 The Provincial Archive
 The Smalls
 The Stampeders
 Theo Tams
 Tupelo Honey
 Ian Tyson
 Chad VanGaalen
 The Wet Secrets
 Zuckerbaby
 Kobra and the Lotus
 Morgan Lander, lead vocalist and guitarist of Kittie
 Viathyn
 Purity Ring
 Ukrainian Male Chorus of Edmonton

References